Boechera (rockcress) is a genus of the family Brassicaceae. It was named after the Danish botanist Tyge W. Böcher (1909–1983), who was known for his research in alpine plants, including the mustards Draba and Boechera holboellii. According to recent molecular-based studies, Boechera is closely related to the genus Arabidopsis which also includes the widely known model plant Arabidopsis thaliana.

Until recently, members of this genus were included in the genus Arabis, but have been separated from that genus based on recent genetic and cytological data. Unlike the genus Arabis (x=8) Boechera has a base chromosome number of x=7. Many taxa are triploid. Boechera is a primarily North American genus, most diverse in the western United States, and its distribution range also includes Greenland and the Russian Far East. The genus is poorly known, and species within are difficult to separate morphologically though some clearly distinct species are known.

Most members of the genus are perennial plants with pubescent leaves with stellate trichomes, narrow curving fruits, and small white to purple flowers in elongated racemes. Relationships within the genus are unclear, and some eastern North American species, including Boechera laevigata, may belong to a clade distinct from the rest of the genus.

A very interesting feature of many species of the genus is asexual reproduction, a process known as apomixis. Microsatellite data has revealed that some of the apomictic lineages are hybrids between two or more sexual parents.

Ecology
Species in this genus are one of the main food sources for the caterpillars of the butterfly Pieris oleracea.

Taxonomy
Selected species
Boechera breweri (Brewer's rockcress)
Boechera canadensis (sicklepod)
Boechera cobrensis (sagebrush rockcress)
Boechera constancei (Constance's rockcress)
Boechera crandallii (Crandall's rockcress)
Boechera dentata (toothed rockcress)
Boechera depauperata (soldier rockcress)
Boechera dispar (pinyon rockcress)
Boechera falcatoria (Grouse Creek rockcress)
Boechera fecunda (sapphire rockcress)
Boechera gracilenta (Selby's rockcress)
Boechera gunnisoniana (Gunnison's rockcress)
Boechera hoffmannii (Hoffmann's rockcress)
Boechera holboellii (Holboell's rockcress)
Boechera laevigata (smooth rockcress)
Boechera lignifera (desert rockcress)
Boechera missouriensis (Missouri rockcress)
Boechera ophira (Ophir rockcress)
Boechera oxylobula (Glenwood Springs rockcress)
Boechera pallidifolia (Gunnison County rockcress)
Boechera patens (Spreading rockcress)
Boechera perennans (perennial rockcress)
Boechera perstellata (Braun's rockcress)
Boechera platysperma (pioneer rockcress)
Boechera pulchra (beautiful rockcress)
Boechera sparsiflora (sicklepod rockcress)
Boechera stricta (Drummond's rockcress)
Boechera tularensis (Tulare rockcress)
Boechera yorkii (Last Chance rockcress)

References

 
Brassicaceae genera